Independence is a city in Polk County, Oregon, United States, on the west bank of the Willamette River along Oregon Route 51, and east of nearby Monmouth.  It is part of the Salem Metropolitan Statistical Area. Thirty square blocks of the oldest part of Independence form the National Register of Historic Places-listed Independence Historic District.

The population was 9,828 at the 2020 census.

History 

Independence was founded by pioneers who migrated from Independence, Missouri. Elvin A. Thorp arrived in the Independence area in 1845 and staked a claim north of Ash Creek in June of that year. He platted a small townsite that later became known as "Thorp's Town of Independence" or the "Original Town of Independence", now known as "Old Town". Thorp named the town for his eponymous hometown in Missouri, as well as in honor of Andrew Jackson's characteristic of "Independence".

In 1847, Henry Hill came across the plains looking for a level piece of ground on which to raise stock. On November 14, 1847, he found his location on the west bank of the Willamette River (south of Ash Street) and marked off his donation land claim, which was  square.  In 1867, after returning from the California gold mines, Hill platted  for a townsite, thereafter to be referred to as Henry Hill's Town of Independence. The city charter bill of February 26, 1885, incorporated E.A. Thorp's Independence and Henry Hill's Independence.  Henry Hill Elementary School was named in honor of the latter.

Independence thrived as a shipping point, by both rail and boat, for agricultural products and lumber until the 1950s. The city was known for its hops production from the 1890s through the 1940s, hosting a festival called the "Hops Fiesta" from the early 1930s to the mid-1950s.  When hop production began to decline in the early 1950s, the city's fortunes also began to decline.

Downtown Independence was bypassed by major freeways in the 1960s, though the period saw an alternative form of transportation enabled by the construction of the Independence State Airport, which was dedicated on August 14, 1964.

Geography
Ash Creek flows through Independence, where it meets the Willamette River.

Demographics

2010 census
As of the census of 2010, there were 8,590 people, 2,857 households, and 2,021 families residing in the city. The racial makeup of the city was 73.3% White, 0.4% African American, 1.8% Native American, 1.2% Asian, 0.2% Pacific Islander, 19.1% from other races, and 4.1% from two or more races. Hispanic or Latino of any race were 35.3% of the population.

There were 2,857 households, of which 42.0% had children under the age of 18 living with them, 51.6% were married couples living together, 12.7% had a female householder with no husband present, 6.5% had a male householder with no wife present, and 29.3% were non-families. 18.6% of all households were made up of individuals, and 5.9% had someone living alone who was 65 years of age or older. The average household size was 2.99 and the average family size was 3.45.

The median age in the city was 28.3 years. 30.5% of residents were under the age of 18; 13.9% were between the ages of 18 and 24; 27.3% were from 25 to 44; 19.5% were from 45 to 64; and 8.7% were 65 years of age or older. The gender makeup of the city was 50.4% male and 49.6% female.

2000 census
As of the census of 2000, there were 6,035 people, 1,994 households, and 1,425 families residing in the city. The population density was 2,585.8 people per square mile (1,000.1/km2). There were 2,131 housing units at an average density of 913.1 per square mile (353.1/km2). The racial makeup of the city was 73.69% White, 1.49% Native American, 0.58% Asian, 0.41% African American, 0.36% Pacific Islander, 19.64% from other races, and 3.83% from two or more races. Hispanic or Latino of any race were 30.12% of the population.

There were 1,994 households, out of which 38.1% had children under the age of 18 living with them, 53.0% were married couples living together, 14.0% had a female householder with no husband present, and 28.5% were non-families. 18.4% of all households were made up of individuals, and 6.8% had someone living alone who was 65 years of age or older. The average household size was 2.98 and the average family size was 3.41.

In the city, the population was spread out, with 30.5% under the age of 18, 14.1% from 18 to 24, 26.4% from 25 to 44, 20.1% from 45 to 64, and 9.0% who were 65 years of age or older. The median age was 29 years. For every 100 females, there were 96.7 males. For every 100 females age 18 and over, there were 93.5 males.

The median income for a household in the city was $36,790, and the median income for a family was $40,466. Males had a median income of $30,253 versus $22,527 for females. The per capita income for the city was $13,933. About 14.6% of families and 16.9% of the population were below the poverty line, including 22.5% of those under age 18 and 7.4% of those age 65 or over.

Education 
Independence shares a school district (Central School District) with Monmouth. An elementary school (Independence), a middle school (Talmadge), and a high school (Central) are shared between the two cities.

References

External links

Entry for Independence in the Oregon Blue Book
Photographs of Independence by Dorothea Lange from the Library of Congress
Home page for Independence, Oregon at https://www.ci.independence.or.us/

 
Cities in Oregon
Cities in Polk County, Oregon
Populated places established in 1874
Salem, Oregon metropolitan area
1874 establishments in Oregon
Populated places on the Willamette River